Michael Callahan may refer to:

 Michael Callahan (basketball) (fl. 1984–2000), Australian wheelchair basketball player and businessman
 Michael Callahan (rowing) (fl. 1992–2013), collegiate rowing coach
 Michael Callahan (soccer) (born 1987), American soccer player
 Michael J. Callahan (fl. 1995–2014), former Yahoo executive
 Michael J. Callahan (New York politician) (1858–1902), American saloonkeeper and politician
 Sean Michael Callahan (born 1975), retired American soccer player
 Michael Shane Callahan, American actor
 Mike Callahan, fictional character in the  Callahan's Crosstime Saloon short stories by Spider Robinson

See also
Michael Callaghan (disambiguation)